The Axis capture of Tobruk, also known as the Fall of Tobruk and the Second Battle of Tobruk (17–21 June 1942) was part of the Western Desert campaign in Libya during the Second World War.

Axis forces had conducted the Siege of Tobruk for eight months in 1941 before its defenders, who had become an emblem of resistance, were relieved in December. Claude Auchinleck, the commander-in-chief Middle East Command, had decided not to defend Tobruk for a second time, due to the cost of bringing supplies in by sea; its minefields and barbed wire had been stripped for use in the Gazala Line to the west. By mid-1942 the Desert Air Force had been forced to move to airfields in Egypt, taking most of them beyond the range of Tobruk. About a third of all garrison personnel were non-combatant or support troops and many of the fighting troops were inexperienced. Lieutenant-General William Gott, the commander of XIII Corps, was withdrawn from Tobruk and on 15 June 1942, five days before the Axis attack. The new commander of the 2nd South African Division, Major-General Hendrik Klopper, was given command of the garrison. An immense stock of supplies had been accumulated around the port for Operation Acrobat but the Axis had forestalled this with Operation Venice and the Battle of Gazala began on 26 May 1942. 

The Eighth Army was defeated in the Battle of Gazala and was driven eastwards toward the Egyptian border, leaving Tobruk isolated. The Prime Minister, Winston Churchill, placed great store on the symbolic value of Tobruk; an exchange of ambiguous signals between Churchill and Auchinleck led to the garrison being surrounded, rather than evacuated as intended. On 20 June the  attacked Tobruk with massed air support, penetrated a weak spot on the eastern defensive perimeter and captured the port. Much of the garrison on the western perimeter had not been attacked but they were cut off from their supplies and transport, without the means to escape from Tobruk, the majority had to surrender; 33,000 prisoners were taken.

The surrender was the second largest capitulation by the British Army in the war, after the fall of Singapore in February 1942. The loss of Tobruk came as a severe blow to the British leadership and precipitated a political crisis in Britain. The United States expedited the dispatch of supplies and equipment to the Middle East. Rommel persuaded the Axis commanders that the supplies captured at Tobruk and the disorganised state of the British forces would enable the Axis easily to occupy Egypt and the Suez Canal. Operation Herkules, the Axis invasion of the island of Malta, was postponed and the Axis air forces instead supported the pursuit into Egypt, which suffered severe supply constraints as the  receded from its bases. The Axis advance was halted at the First Battle of Alamein in July 1942. 

A British Court of Inquiry was held  later in the year, which exonerated Klopper and ascribed the defeat to failures among the British high command. Only seven copies of the verdict were circulated, one being transmitted to General Jan Smuts on 2 October 1942. The findings were kept secret until after the war, which did little to restore the reputation of Klopper or his troops.

Background

The small port of Tobruk in Italian Cyrenaica had been fortified by the Italians from 1935. Tobruk was captured by Australian forces in January 1941 during Operation Compass, the first large Allied military operation of the Western Desert Campaign. Following the arrival of the German  commanded by Erwin Rommel in Operation Sonnenblume in March, Axis forces retook much of the lost territory in Cyrenaica; Tobruk was cut off and besieged between April and December 1941.

Using the Italian defences, ill-organised attacks by Axis forces were defeated by the 30,000-strong Australian garrison (replaced in September by a British and Allied force), allowing time for the fortifications to be improved. The Allied occupation of Tobruk was a threat to the Axis communications, it denied them the use of the port, and it tied down four Italian divisions and three German battalions, a force twice the size of the garrison. During 1941, supplied from the sea and surviving successive Axis assaults, the defence of Tobruk became a symbol of the British war effort. The relief of Tobruk was the object of Operation Brevity in May and Operation Battleaxe in June, both of which failed. Operation Crusader in November and December 1941 raised the siege and forced the Axis out of Cyrenaica into Tripolitania.

Supplied with more modern tanks, the second Axis offensive saw the reoccupation of western Cyrenaica but the Axis ran out of supplies to the west of Gazala. A lull followed as both sides prepared for a new offensive. The British built up the Gazala Line, fortified positions known as "boxes", defended by extensive minefields. Poorly armed and armoured British tanks and inferior co-ordination allowed Rommel to defeat the Eighth Army tanks piecemeal and by 13 June the British had begun to retreat eastwards from Gazala, leaving Tobruk vulnerable to attack.

Axis plans
It was decided that Rommel should start  (Operation Venice), an offensive at the end of May, to capture Tobruk. If successful, Rommel was to go no further east than the Egyptian border and take up defensive positions while an invasion of Malta (Operation Herkules) was undertaken in mid-July. The capture of Malta would secure the Axis supply lines to North Africa before Rommel invaded Egypt, with the Suez Canal as the final objective. Axis planning had been given considerable assistance after the Italian  (Military Information Service) had broken the Black Code used by Colonel Bonner Fellers, the US military attaché in Cairo, to send detailed and often critical reports to Washington of the British war effort in the Middle East.

British plans

The commanders knew how valuable the port would be to Axis forces but decided against defending it. General Sir Claude Auchinleck was reluctant to have a valuable division tied down as a garrison, especially as reinforcements might be urgently needed for Persia and Iraq; Admiral Sir Andrew Cunningham could not risk the shipping losses incurred supplying the garrison during the first siege.

Air Marshal Sir Peter Drummond (deputy to Air Chief Marshal Sir Arthur Tedder), contended that it might prove impossible to provide fighter cover for the port. Auchinleck drafted orders for Lieutenant-General Neil Ritchie, the commander of the Eighth Army, that he was to make every effort to prevent Tobruk from being taken but he was not to allow his forces to be surrounded there. If the fall of Tobruk was imminent, "the place should be evacuated and the maximum amount of destruction carried out in it", while a firm defence line should be established further east on the Egyptian border. This withdrawal arrangement was formalised as Operation Freeborn.

By 14 June, Operation Venice had forced Ritchie to implement Operation Freeborn, the withdrawal of the 50th (Northumbrian) Infantry Division and the 1st South African Infantry Division from the Gazala line, eastwards through Tobruk and on towards the Egyptian border. On the previous day, Auchinleck had confirmed to Ritchie that, if all else failed, the frontier should be "a rallying point". Auchinleck began to reassess the Tobruk position; neither he nor Ritchie wanted to lose the considerable stocks of fuel, munitions and other stores which had been built up at the port for Operation Acrobat. On the morning of 14 June, he had received a message from Winston Churchill that "retreat would be fatal"; despite the misgivings of his senior commanders, Churchill had apparently told Roosevelt that he would hold Tobruk.

Auchinleck signalled to Ritchie that he was to hold a line from Acroma (west of Tobruk) extending south-east to El Adem, which would screen Tobruk. Ritchie did not receive the order until two hours before his carefully organised night withdrawal was due to start; too late to alter the manoeuvre. The 50th (Northumbrian) and 1st South African divisions were saved from encirclement but were withdrawn beyond the line which Auchinleck intended them to hold. Ritchie informed Auchinleck that he would attempt to hold the Acroma–El Adem line with troops from XXX Corps but warned that if this failed, Tobruk might either become "temporarily isolated" or be evacuated and asked which option was to be taken. Auchinleck replied that "On no account will any part of the Eighth Army be allowed to be surrounded in Tobruk and invested there", which Ritchie interpreted as meaning that he should evacuate Tobruk if there were an Axis breakthrough. On the morning of 15 June, the situation was confused further by a message from Churchill which included the phrase "Presume there is no question in any case of giving up Tobruk?" Auchinleck replied to Churchill that Ritchie had sufficient troops to hold Tobruk. Auchinleck then signalled to Ritchie that although Tobruk was "not to be invested", it could be "isolated for short periods" and that he should organise a garrison accordingly. It was clear to Ritchie that the collapse of the Acroma–El Adem line was imminent.

Tobruk isolated

The area around El Adem was held by 29th Indian Infantry Brigade (Brigadier Denys Reid). On 15 June, the 90th Light Division attacked El Adem three times by but was repulsed by the defenders. The attacks on El Adem were stopped after further reverses but the threat of being surrounded caused its evacuation on the night of 16/17 June. This left RAF Gambut on the coast vulnerable, causing the Desert Air Force (DAF) to withdraw eastwards, severely limiting air support. The last outpost of the defensive line was Belhamed, a hill adjacent to Sidi Rezegh, which was held by the 20th Indian Infantry Brigade, a new formation.

On 17 June, the 4th Armoured Brigade was ordered to attack, hoping to take the flank of the German armour, now supplemented by 15th Panzer Division, as it moved northwards towards the coast. The brigade had been hurriedly reformed after the Gazala battles and had about ninety tanks in composite units but lacked much of its artillery, which had been detached to form harassing columns. After an engagement lasting most of the afternoon, the British brigade withdrew to refit and then towards Egypt, having lost 32 tanks. The 20th Indian Brigade was ordered to withdraw during that night but were caught as the German armour reached the coast at Gambut and two of its battalions were captured. Also captured was the abandoned RAF base with 15 aircraft and considerable fuel supplies; to the west, a vast Allied stores dump with thousands of lorries was taken. The next morning, 18 June, Rommel was able to report to Berlin that Tobruk had been surrounded and was under siege.

Opposing forces

Tobruk garrison

The Tobruk garrison was numerically large at about 33,000 men but this number included around 8,000 support troops and around 2,000 non-combatant labourers. A third of the garrison comprised the 2nd South African Infantry Division (Major General Hendrik Klopper, who was put in charge of the defence of Tobruk on 15 June. The division was a brigade short, consisting of the 4th South African Infantry Brigade and 6th South African Infantry Brigade and attached units. The 2nd South African Division was not a veteran formation but it had captured Bardia and Sollum during Operation Crusader in January and had been based in Tobruk since the end of March. Klopper had been a staff officer of the division and had taken over from Major-General I. P. de Villiers on 14 May (a month previous).

The British 32nd Army Tank Brigade (Brigadier Arthur Willison) had three squadrons of the 4th Royal Tank Regiment (4th RTR) with 35 operational Valentine tanks, two squadrons of the 7th RTR with parts of the 8th RTR and 42nd RTR, with 26 serviceable Valentines and Matildas. The 201st Guards Motor Brigade had the 3rd Coldstream Guards, up to establishment and with ten 6-pounder anti-tank guns, the 1st Battalion, Sherwood Foresters, nearly at full strength with four 6-pounders and 500 men of the 1st Battalion, Worcestershire Regiment, which had been mauled at Point 187 on 14 June. The 11th Indian Infantry Brigade had the experienced 2nd Battalion, Queen's Own Cameron Highlanders, 2/5th Mahratta Light Infantry with many young replacements and the inexperienced 2/7th Gurkha Rifles, an understrength anti-tank company and Beergroup (Lieutenant-Colonel John de Beer), a composite infantry battalion from the 1st South African Division. 

The garrison included the field artillery of the 2nd and 3rd South African Field Regiments and the 25th Field Regiment RA, the 67th and 68th Medium Regiments RA, each with eight 4.5-inch guns and eight 155 mm M1918 howitzers. The 6th South African Anti-Tank Battery and A Battery, 95th Anti-Tank Regiment RA were both understrength with fifteen new 6-pounder anti-tank guns, 32 of the older and less effective 2-pounders and eight Bofors 37 mm anti-tank guns. There were eighteen 3.7-inch heavy anti-aircraft guns of the 4th Anti-Aircraft Brigade RA (eighteen had been withdrawn to the frontier on 16 June) and the light guns of the 2nd South African Light Anti-Aircraft Regiment. Many non-essential troops had been evacuated, there remained a number of administrative units of the HQ 88th Sub-Area ( Brigadier Leslie Thompson) including ten transport companies and a Naval Establishment (Captain P. N. Walter RN). The fighter aircraft of 40 Squadron (SAAF) had been withdrawn from the airfield within the perimeter but a Air Support Tentacle remained. The squadrons of the Desert Air Force had moved back to airfields at Sidi Barrani, which put Tobruk beyond the range of their fighters except for the Curtiss Kittyhawks of 250 Squadron RAF, which had drop tanks. 

The South African brigades held the west and south-west sectors of the perimeter, where most of the fighting in the first siege had taken place. The Indian brigade was deployed to the east and south of the perimeter. On average, each anti-tank gun would have had to defend a frontage of  if they had been spread evenly around the perimeter. Owing to the decision not to stand another siege, little work had been done to maintain the Tobruk fortifications. In many places, the trenches and the anti-tank ditch had collapsed or filled with drifting sand and part of the ditch had been filled in to allow the British armour to cross during the December 1941 breakout. Large quantities of barbed wire and land mines had been removed to bolster the Gazala defences, while some of the old Italian mines which remained were found to be defective. Some work had been done by South African engineers to remedy the situation but there is conflicting evidence as to the condition of the defences at the start of the siege.

Klopper was put in charge of the Tobruk garrison on 15 June, five days before the Axis attack. On 16 June, Lieutenant-General William Gott, the commander of XIII Corps, whose headquarters were still in Tobruk, suggested that he should take command but was overruled by Ritchie and he left Tobruk, leaving three of his staff officers to assist Klopper. Gott ordered Klopper to prepare three plans – for co-operating with the Allied forces outside Tobruk, for re-establishing a presence at Belhamed and for the evacuation of the garrison eastwards. This placed a considerable extra burden on Klopper and his staff who were already very busy.

/

A plan for the rapid capture of Tobruk had been agreed between Kesselring and Cavallero on 10 June, consisting of an attack in stages from the south and west. Rommel ignored them and used his plan of October 1941, attacking from the south-east, where the ground was flatter than the gullied terrain in the south-west. He began to deploy his forces to their jumping-off positions on 18 June.

On the western end of the line was the Italian XXI Corps comprising the 7th Bersaglieri Regiment, the 60th Infantry Division "Sabratha" and the 102nd Motorised Division "Trento", southwards from the coast. At the south-west corner of the perimeter was the German 15th Rifle Brigade. To the south was the Italian X Corps with the 27th Infantry Division "Brescia" forward and the 17th Infantry Division "Pavia" in reserve. In the south-eastern corner were the German 90th Light Division and the Axis artillery. On the eastern boundary was the Italian XX Motorised Corps with the 101st Motorised Division "Trieste" forward; the 132nd Armoured Division "Ariete" was in the south-west at Bir er Reghem and the newly arrived 133rd Armoured Division "Littorio" was moving in behind it. The 15th Panzer Division and 21st Panzer Division were in the east, on either side of the village of Kambut.

Kesselring had warned that, because all Axis aircraft had to be withdrawn by the end of June, for the invasion of Malta, an early result was vital. About 150 bombers of various types were available, mostly German, including 40 to 50 fighter-bombers and 21 Junkers Ju 87 dive-bombers. About 50 German and 100 Italian fighters were also within range. The recent capture of airfields close to the Tobruk perimeter allowed for rapid refuelling and rearming.

Battle

18–19 June

Wishing to exploit the disorganisation of the Eighth Army, Rommel issued his orders for the assault on 18 June and reconnaissance of deployment areas commenced early the next day. Starting in the afternoon of 19 June and through that night, the  armoured formations changed places with 90th Light Division, so that they were facing the south-eastern corner of the perimeter, occupied by the inexperienced 2nd Battalion, 5th Mahratta Light Infantry. The 15th Panzer Division was on the left of the attack and 21st Panzer on the right, with a motorised infantry group (detached from the 90th Light Division and commanded by  Erwin Menny) in the centre. XX Corps was to attack further to the left, followed by X Corps, which was to occupy and hold the perimeter defences. In the west, XXI Corps was to make a feint attack to pin down the South African brigades, while in the east, the 90th Light Division was to prevent relief attempts on Tobruk by the Eighth Army. When the Axis artillery arrived at their positions near El Adem, they found Axis ammunition, which had been abandoned in November and had never been cleared away.

20 June

Morning
The assault opened at 5:20 a.m. on 20 June with an intense air bombardment on the south-eastern perimeter. The  flew 588 sorties, the highest sortie rate achieved in the Mediterranean theatre, while the  flew 177. The German 900th Engineer Battalion was able to make crossings over the anti-tank ditch, using prefabricated bridging equipment; the first German tanks were across the ditch by 8:30 a.m. The Mahrattas committed their reserves in an abortive counter-attack and although they had been given to understand that a tank battalion would be coming to their assistance, this never materialised.

After initially thinking that the attack in the south-east was a feint, Klopper's headquarters gave orders for a counter-attack by the 32nd Army Tank Brigade, supported by whatever elements of the Guards and Indian brigades they required. The orders were misunderstood at the tank brigade headquarters and they ordered only the 4th RTR to attack. The assistance of a battlegroup from the 3rd Battalion, Coldstream Guards was declined through lack of orders. The counter-attack might have succeeded if it had been made with greater force, while the Axis armour was still making its way across the anti-tank ditch. By the time it had begun, the  had been moving into the perimeter for an hour and a half and the  armoured division was established on their left. The 7th RTR moved up in support on their own initiative but half were diverted to assist the Camerons. The  defeated the British armour in detail, aided by constant attack from the air. The only British air raid that morning was called for the forward air control "tentacle" to bomb Axis vehicles moving through the south-east breach and was carried out by nine Douglas Bostons escorted by long-range Kittyhawk fighters.

Noon, 20 June
By noon, Rommel had 113 tanks inside the Tobruk perimeter. The 21st Panzer headed for the town, scattering the remaining tanks of the 7th RTR. The last obstacle for the panzers was a motley of artillery units which made a determined defence, including the use of several 3.7-inch anti-aircraft guns against the German tanks; Rommel later praised their "extraordinary tenacity". Later in the afternoon, Klopper's headquarters was bombarded. At 4:00 p.m., German tanks were seen to the east and Klopper thought that his headquarters, to the south-west of the town, was in danger of being overrun. He ordered a hurried evacuation, in which much of the communication equipment was destroyed. The German tanks moved off in a different direction but without communications equipment, Klopper moved to the headquarters of 6th South African Brigade in the north-west of the fortress at 6:30 p.m.

Evening, 20 June
The leading German units had not reached the outskirts of the port until 6:00 p.m. British engineers and supply troops began to destroy the immense quantities of fuel, water, ammunition and stores in the town along with the port facilities. The 15th Panzer Division had begun to advance westwards along the Pilastrino Ridge, where elements of the 201st Guards Brigade had taken up exposed positions at short notice. When their brigade headquarters was overrun at about 6:45 p.m., most of the units either stopped fighting or withdrew to Fort Pilastrano at the western end of the ridge. The 15th Panzer ended their advance since they were under orders to cover the approach of 21st Panzer to the town, which was reported to have been taken at 7:00 p.m. The final evacuation of small naval vessels had been carried out under fire; fifteen craft escaped but twenty-five, including a minesweeper, were sunk in the harbour or lost to air attacks on the passage to Alexandria.

At last light, the Axis units halted for the night. The remnants of the British and Indian units in the eastern sector of the fortress prepared themselves for all-round defence; the South African brigades had not been engaged except for some diversionary activity. From Klopper's new headquarters came a signal that all units should prepare to break out at 10:00 p.m. and a message was sent to the Eighth Army HQ, "Am holding out but I do not know for how long". The Eighth Army staff suggested that the breakout should be on the following night (21/22 June) and that it was essential that all the fuel be destroyed. Although Ritchie had ordered the 7th Armoured Division to move north towards Sidi Rezegh, to the south-east of the Tobruk perimeter, there is no evidence that they advanced very far or threatened the Axis cordon. Discussions between Klopper, his brigadiers and staff officers followed. The chances of a breakout were impeded by the fact that the 2nd South African Division was not a motorised formation and many of the vehicles that they did possess were in the town and had been captured. The option to stand and fight in the western sector was considered but the main ammunition dumps had also been captured. At 2:00 a.m. on 21 June, Klopper signalled to the Eighth Army HQ that he would attempt a breakout that evening. In the meantime, the garrison would "fight to the last man and the last round".

21 June

As dawn approached Klopper changed his mind and concluded that any value to be gained from continuing the fight would not be worth the cost in additional casualties. In an exchange of signals at 6:00 a.m. Ritchie sent, "I cannot tell tactical situation and therefore leave you to act on your own judgement regarding capitulation". Shortly after this, German officers were invited to Klopper's headquarters to finalise the details. Orders to surrender were sent out and received with astonishment by those units who had scarcely been engaged. Some units did not receive the order; the 2nd Battalion, 7th Gurkha Rifles, on the eastern perimeter, fought on until that evening, while the Cameron Highlanders continued fighting until the morning of 22 June. Captain Sainthill of the Coldstream Guards and 199 of his officers and men were able to break out of the south-west perimeter in their battalion transport and rejoin the Eighth Army. A small group of 188 South Africans, largely of the Kaffrarian Rifles, escaped eastwards along the coast and reached El Alamein 38 days later. Rommel entered the town at 5:00 a.m. and established his headquarters at the Hotel Tobruk.

Aftermath

Analysis
In 1942, a Court of Inquiry was held , which found Klopper to be largely blameless for the surrender. The verdict was kept secret, it did little to enhance his or his troops' reputation. After the war, Winston Churchill wrote that the blame belonged to the British High Command, not to Klopper or his troops. He accepted that the facts were obscured at the time as the Tobruk leadership were all prisoners of war but that the truth had since emerged. The British official historian, Ian Playfair wrote in 1960 that "the reasons for the disaster are plain enough". It was commonly accepted that there was no intention of withstanding another siege of Tobruk and that the port was not prepared for one. Neither Auchinleck nor Ritchie appreciated the extent of the defeat which the Eighth Army had suffered at Gazala or that the Eighth Army was no longer able simultaneously to continue to fight in the Tobruk area, defend the frontier and prepare a counter-attack. Klopper and his staff did not have the experience to make best use of their resources under such difficult circumstances. Rommel had overwhelming air support at Tobruk, because almost all of the Allied fighter aircraft had been withdrawn out of range of Tobruk; Luftwaffe bombing played a key role in breaching the defences.

Repercussions
On 21 June, the prime minister, Winston Churchill and the Chief of the Imperial General Staff, Alan Brooke, were attending the Second Washington Conference discussing grand strategy with the US President, Franklin D. Roosevelt and the U.S. Army Chief of Staff, George C. Marshall. An American aide arrived with the news of the Tobruk surrender, which he gave to the President who passed it to Churchill. Churchill's military aide Hastings Ismay contacted London and confirmed the news. The conference also received a telegram from British Minister-Resident in the Middle East Richard Casey warning that the defeat opened the possibility of an Axis invasion of Egypt. Churchill recalled in his memoirs,

Roosevelt asked General Marshall to see what could be done. Marshall ordered the 2nd Armored Division, which was training with its new M4 Sherman tanks, to prepare to move to Egypt. When it became apparent that this new formation could not be made operational until the autumn, Marshall decided instead to send three hundred of their Shermans, a hundred M7 Priest (105 mm self-propelled guns), spare parts and one hundred and fifty instructors, in a fast convoy beginning on 1 July.

Brooke later wrote

On 25 June the Maldon by-election was won by Tom Driberg, a left-wing journalist, standing as an Independent, who gained sixty per cent of the vote, defeating the Conservative Party candidate. Churchill and others attributed the defeat to the loss of Tobruk four days before; Driberg denied this was a major factor, suggesting instead that it was part of a wider swing to the left and away from the established political parties. In parliament, there was a growing feeling that Churchill was responsible for the muddle and lack of direction in the management of the war, despite his popularity with the public. The Labour Party MP Aneurin Bevan tried to force a parliamentary enquiry into Churchill's role in the defeats at Gazala and Tobruk but was prevented by Clement Attlee, the Labour Deputy Prime Minister. When a right-wing Conservative, Sir John Wardlaw-Milne, tabled a motion of no-confidence in the coalition government, there was speculation that it might go the way of the Norway Debate, which had led to the resignation of the previous prime minister, Neville Chamberlain, in May 1940. The debate opened on 1 July and on the following day Bevan attacked Churchill by saying that he "fights debates like a war and war like a debate". Churchill replied with (according to Anthony Eden) "one of his most effective speeches" and the government won by 425 votes to 25.

Casualties

It was the second largest capitulation by the British Army in the war after the fall of Singapore and the biggest defeat in the history of the Union Defence Force. German propaganda initially reported that the Wehrmacht had captured 25,000 Allied prisoners of war, which turned out to be an underestimate as the true total was 33,000. The Germans left the task of housing the prisoners to the Italians, who lacked the infrastructure to treat the prisoners in accordance with the Geneva Convention. The prisoners were crammed into open pens to await deportation and were left seriously short of food and water. Conditions improved after the prisoners had been transported in cargo ships to Italy. Many of them, especially South Africans, were subject to recriminations from other prisoners who felt that Tobruk had surrendered too easily. At the Italian armistice in September 1943, many prisoners escaped, including Klopper, who was rescued by Popski's Private Army (Major Vladimir Peniakoff) which was operating nearby. The number of Eighth Army prisoners taken in the battle is not known precisely because the Eighth Army records were lost. Axis casualties are not known either but German casualties for the fighting since 26 May (including Gazala) was reported as 3,360 of whom 300 were officers; German losses for 20 to 22 June would have been considerably less than that. An estimate of British casualties was published in the British official history, the History of the Second World War  The Mediterranean and Middle East: British Fortunes Reach Their Lowest Ebb and is shown in the table above.

Axis

The Nazi hierarchy shared Churchill's view of the symbolic importance of Tobruk and Joseph Goebbels, the Reich Minister of Propaganda, made much of its capture. Although Rommel undoubtedly considered it a great honour, he later confided to his wife that he would rather have been given another division. Mussolini was also jubilant and is said to have ordered that a suitable white horse be found for his triumphal entry into Cairo.

Amongst the 2,000 vehicles captured were 30 serviceable tanks. It has been estimated that Rommel was using some 6,000 captured British lorries by the end of the month. Because of the tenuous Axis supply line, the troops had been living on very short rations and the British supplies were enthusiastically received, especially chocolate, canned milk and vegetables; stores of shirts and socks were enthusiastically looted. The equally deprived Italian troops tended to be excluded from the plundering.

In the afternoon of 21 June, the day of the surrender, Kesselring visited Rommel's headquarters and reminded him of the agreement that the invasion of Malta would follow the capture of Tobruk and that his aircraft were already returning to Italy. The next day, a senior Italian staff officer arrived with orders from General Bastico to halt. Rommel, now a field marshal, was able to decline this "advice". He had the latest pessimistic report from the U.S. military attaché Bonner Fellers in Cairo to Washington on the British dispositions, which concluded with the phrase; "If Rommel intends to take the Delta, now is the time"; the supplies captured at Tobruk made that possible.

Axis invasion of Egypt
On 22 June, Rommel by-passed the chain of command by writing directly to Mussolini via the German attaché in Rome, Enno von Rintelen, requesting that the offensive be allowed to continue and that the Malta invasion be postponed to preserve his air support. Mussolini forwarded the letter to Hitler, who had been harbouring doubts about the Malta operation. Hitler replied the next day with an effusive letter which agreed with Rommel's suggestion and urged Mussolini not to let the opportunity slip away, stating that "the goddess of success passes generals only once". The British retreat soon became a rout. Ritchie decided not to regroup at the Egyptian border as planned but further east at the fortified port and army base at Mersa Matruh. Auchinleck sacked Ritchie on 25 June, taking charge of the Eighth Army and began a further withdrawal to a better defensive position at El Alamein. On the next day, Rommel arrived at Matruh and broke through in the centre. The Battle of Mersa Matruh was another fiasco for the Eighth Army, who suffered 8,000 casualties and lost a lot of equipment and supplies but the bulk of the Eighth Army was able to break out and fall back to El Alamein. Rommel hoped that a swift central attack on the new British positions might succeed in the same way as at Mersa Matruh but he was moving further away from his air support and supply bases. The Axis came correspondingly within the range of the DAF and their advance was eventually halted at the First Battle of El Alamein. El Alamein was to be the furthest advance eastwards of the Panzer Army Africa.

See also 
 List of British military equipment of World War II
 List of German military equipment of World War II
 List of Italian military equipment in World War II

References

Sources

Books

Journals

External links 
 Hansard: Central Direction of the War. House of Commons Debate 2 July 1942
 Siege of Tobruk, 17–21 June 1942
 Fall of Tobruk (German newsreel)

Conflicts in 1942
1942 in Libya
Tobruk
Western Desert campaign
Libya in World War II
Battles of World War II involving the United Kingdom
Battles and operations of World War II involving South Africa
Battles and operations of World War II involving India
Battles of World War II involving Italy
Battles of World War II involving Germany
Erwin Rommel
June 1942 events